James Campbell Fraser (14 March 1840 – 23 November 1913) was a Scottish first-class cricketer and merchant.

The son of William Fraser, a Scottish plantation owner, he was born at his father's sugar plantation in Demerara in March 1840. He was educated in England at Harrow School, and upon leaving he became one of the first people to enlist in the 19th Lancashire Rifle Volunteer Corps, joining as an ensign in January 1860. In 1861, he made a single appearance in first-class cricket for the Gentlemen of Marylebone Cricket Club against the Gentlemen of Kent at the Canterbury Cricket Week. Batting twice in the match, he was dismissed scores of 12 and 16 by Richard Streatfeild and Fendall Currie respectively. In the same year he began employment in Liverpool as a merchants clerk, before travelling to Yokohama in Japan in 1862. There he played for and captained Yokohama Cricket Club, playing against a Royal Navy team in 1863. He became a partner at Yokohama in the firm Ross, Barber & Co., before forming his own company, James C. Fraser & Co. in 1867, which specialised in insurance and trade; however Fraser left Japan in the same year to return to Liverpool.

In 1869 while in the United States, he travelled aboard the first transcontinental train between New York and San Francisco, staying as a guest of Brigham Young in Salt Lake City during the trip. His connection with The States remained into the 1890s, when he represented New Orleans at the National Nicaragua Canal Convention, which discussed plans for the Panama Canal. Fraser died in England in November 1913, at Lynton, Devon.

References

External links

1840 births
1913 deaths
People from Demerara-Mahaica
People educated at Harrow School
Scottish cricketers
Gentlemen of Marylebone Cricket Club cricketers
Scottish merchants
Scottish expatriates in Japan
Clan Fraser